Trichosalpinx, commonly known as the bonnet orchid, is a genus of about 100 species of neotropical orchid. The genus is widespread across most of Latin America from northern Mexico to Bolivia, as well as the West Indies.

Trichosalpinx is characterized by the presence of a ringed, ribbed sheath around the stem. The generic name means "trumpet with hair" and refers to this ring.

Species
Species accepted by the Plants of the World Online as of February 2021.

Trichosalpinx acestrochila 
Trichosalpinx acremona 
Trichosalpinx adnata 
Trichosalpinx alabastra 
Trichosalpinx amygdalodora 
Trichosalpinx arbuscula 
Trichosalpinx atropurpurea 
Trichosalpinx ballatrix 
Trichosalpinx barbelifera 
Trichosalpinx blaisdellii 
Trichosalpinx bricenoensis 
Trichosalpinx calceolaris 
Trichosalpinx carinatus 
Trichosalpinx carinilabia 
Trichosalpinx carmeniae 
Trichosalpinx carvii 
Trichosalpinx caudata 
Trichosalpinx cedralensis 
Trichosalpinx chaetoglossa 
Trichosalpinx ciliaris 
Trichosalpinx costata 
Trichosalpinx crucilabia 
Trichosalpinx cryptantha 
Trichosalpinx cunorensis 
Trichosalpinx dalstroemii 
Trichosalpinx deceptrix 
Trichosalpinx decorata 
Trichosalpinx dentialae 
Trichosalpinx diazii 
Trichosalpinx dirhamphis 
Trichosalpinx dressleri 
Trichosalpinx drosoides 
Trichosalpinx dunstervillei 
Trichosalpinx dura 
Trichosalpinx ectopa 
Trichosalpinx egleri 
Trichosalpinx escobarii 
Trichosalpinx fasciculata 
Trichosalpinx fissa 
Trichosalpinx franciscantha 
Trichosalpinx fruticosa 
Trichosalpinx gabi-villegasiae 
Trichosalpinx gentryi 
Trichosalpinx giovi-mendietae 
Trichosalpinx hirtzii 
Trichosalpinx hypocrita 
Trichosalpinx inaequisepala 
Trichosalpinx inquisiviensis 
Trichosalpinx intricata 
Trichosalpinx jimburae 
Trichosalpinx jostii 
Trichosalpinx lamellata 
Trichosalpinx lenticularis 
Trichosalpinx ligulata 
Trichosalpinx lilliputalis 
Trichosalpinx macphersonii 
Trichosalpinx membraniflora 
Trichosalpinx memor 
Trichosalpinx metamorpha 
Trichosalpinx minutipetala 
Trichosalpinx montana 
Trichosalpinx multicuspidata 
Trichosalpinx nana 
Trichosalpinx navarrensis 
Trichosalpinx notosibirica 
Trichosalpinx nymphalis 
Trichosalpinx ollgaardiana 
Trichosalpinx orbicularis 
Trichosalpinx otarion 
Trichosalpinx pandurata 
Trichosalpinx parsonsii 
Trichosalpinx pringlei 
Trichosalpinx pseudolepanthes 
Trichosalpinx psilantha 
Trichosalpinx pumila 
Trichosalpinx pusilla 
Trichosalpinx quitensis 
Trichosalpinx ramosii 
Trichosalpinx reflexa 
Trichosalpinx reticulata 
Trichosalpinx ringens 
Trichosalpinx robledorum 
Trichosalpinx roraimensis 
Trichosalpinx rotundata 
Trichosalpinx sanctuarii 
Trichosalpinx scabridula 
Trichosalpinx semilunata 
Trichosalpinx silverstonei 
Trichosalpinx sipapoensis 
Trichosalpinx solomonii 
Trichosalpinx spathulata 
Trichosalpinx steyermarkii 
Trichosalpinx strumifera 
Trichosalpinx systremmata 
Trichosalpinx tantilla 
Trichosalpinx teaguei 
Trichosalpinx tenuiflora 
Trichosalpinx tenuis 
Trichosalpinx teres 
Trichosalpinx todziae 
Trichosalpinx trachystoma 
Trichosalpinx triangulipetala 
Trichosalpinx trilobata 
Trichosalpinx tropida 
Trichosalpinx uvaria 
Trichosalpinx vagans 
Trichosalpinx webbiae 
Trichosalpinx werneri 
Trichosalpinx wilhelmii 
Trichosalpinx xiphochila 
Trichosalpinx yanganensis 
Trichosalpinx zunagensis

References

 
Pleurothallidinae genera
Orchids of Mexico
Orchids of Central America
Orchids of North America
Orchids of South America
Flora of the Caribbean